State Route 345 (SR 345) is a north–south state highway in the eastern portion of the U.S. state of Ohio.  The southern terminus of SR 345 is at a signalized intersection with the SR 13/SR 37 concurrency in New Lexington.  Its northern terminus is at a T-intersection with U.S. Route 22 (US 22) in the unincorporated community of East Fultonham.

Route description
SR 345 traverses the northeastern quadrant of Perry County and the southwestern corner of Muskingum County.  This state route is not included as a component of the National Highway System (NHS).  The NHS is a system of highways identified as most important for the economy, mobility and defense of the nation.

History
The SR 345 designation was assigned in 1935.  It was originally routed along its present alignment from its southern terminus in New Lexington to its northeastern junction with SR 669, and then along the current routing of SR 669 from that point southeasterly into Crooksville.

Two years later, SR 345 was re-routed from the point that  currently marks its northeastern junction with SR 669 onto a new alignment along a previously un-numbered roadway to the point that marks its current northern terminus at US 22 in East Fultonham.

Major intersections

References

345
345
345